Flatwoods salamanders are mole salamanders of Florida, Georgia, and South Carolina:

 Ambystoma cingulatum, the frosted flatwoods salamander, native to the coastal plan in South Carolina, Georgia, and Florida east of the Apalachicola River
 Ambystoma bishopi, the reticulated flatwoods salamander, native to the western Florida panhandle and southwestern Georgia

Animal common name disambiguation pages